The Toronto Rock are a lacrosse team based in Toronto playing in the National Lacrosse League (NLL). The 2000 season was the 3rd in franchise history and 2nd as the Rock.

The Rock finished on top of the NLL standings, winning its division for the second straight year. The Rock beat the Philadelphia Wings in the semifinals, to advance to the championship game.  Their victory over the Rochester Knighthawks in this game gave them their second consecutive championship.

Regular season

Conference standings

Game log
Reference:

Playoffs

Game log
Reference:

Player stats

Runners (Top 10)

Note: GP = Games played; G = Goals; A = Assists; Pts = Points; LB = Loose Balls; PIM = Penalty minutes

Goaltenders
Note: GP = Games played; MIN = Minutes; W = Wins; L = Losses; GA = Goals against; Sv% = Save percentage; GAA = Goals against average

Awards

Roster

See also
2000 NLL season

References

External links
 

Toronto
National Lacrosse League Champion's Cup-winning seasons
2000 in Toronto